Oak Ridge is an unincorporated community in Armstrong County, Pennsylvania, United States. The community is located on the south bank of Redbank Creek between Hawthorn and New Bethlehem. Oak Ridge has a post office, with ZIP code 16245.

Notes

Unincorporated communities in Armstrong County, Pennsylvania
Unincorporated communities in Pennsylvania